The Power and the Glory is a 1941 Australian war film about a Czech scientist who escapes from the Nazis to live in Australia. It features an early screen performance by Peter Finch.

Plot
In Europe, a peaceful Czech scientist, Professor Marnelle, has unintentionally developed a nerve gas while working on a new fuel. Marnelle doesn't want to use his invention for evil but he's threatened by his Nazi masters, including Von Schweig with a concentration camp. Marnelle destroys his lab and manages to escape with his daughter Elsa – but is then recaptured.

We then meet two members of the British secret service who are in a café – when another man is arrested the two of them flee. They trick a passing German car into stopping and knock them out – to discover Marnelle and his daughter are in the back seat, prisoners. They take the Germans uniforms, drive the prisoners to the airport and manage to escape in a plane. The Marnelles go to Australia but the Nazis find out about it and decide to track him there.

Marnelle starts working for the Australian air force and meets pilot Frank Miller. Nazi officer Von Schweig arrives in Australia and meets up with local fifth columnists who are planning sabotage on Australian planes – Miller's ends up crashing and he winds up in hospital.

By this stage the war has started and there is a scene where Von Schweig and a fifth columnist, Dr Vass, look at some Australian soldiers marching past. Von Schweig says "we did not expect the enthusiasm of the dominions" for the war. Dr Vass says that he has been in Australia for a number of years and still does not understand them, adding that "you expect from their interest in sport that nothing else matters, but in war the greater the danger the harder they fought".

Miller and his friend Ted Jackson visit the Marnelles in their rural hideaway, where they are looked after by a comic Chinaman; Ted has fallen for Elsa. The fifth columnists and Von Schweig meet up with a spy who is revealed to be Frank Miller. Miller tells them where to find the scientist; they capture and start torturing him to find the formula.

The Germans are about to take the Marnelles back to Europe but Mack manages to sneak off and inform the authorities. Ted Jackson rescues Marnelle but Miller's treachery enables the Germans to take off with the formula. Jackson hops in a plane and flies after Miller and Von Schweig, shooting them down in a dog fight. A German U-boat is also destroyed.

Cast
Katrin Rosselle as Els Marnelle
Eric Bush as Ted Jackson
Lou Vernon as Professor Marnelle
Eric Reiman as Von Schweig
Peter Finch as Frank Miller
Sidney Wheeler as His Excellency
Charles Kilburn as John Burton
Joe Valli as Mack
John Fernside as Dr Vass
Max Osbiston as flight leader
Beatrice Wenban as Freda
Harry Abdy as Fritz Grubler
Horace Cleary as Wong
Ron Dargin as Bluey
Clement Kennedy as Weary
Raymond Longford as Nazi Admiral

Production
The story was an original one by Monkman, who then worked on the script with Harry Lauder. Filming commenced in June 1940. Shooting took place at Fig Tree Studios in Hunters Hill, Sydney with additional scenes shot at Camden. Financing was made possible by an overdraft guaranteed by the New South Wales government.

The female star, Katrin Roselle, was an Austrian migrant who married an Australian then moved to Hollywood after the film was made.

Finch was injured during filming when wind filled an open parachute he was holding and pulled him off his feet at the RAAF base at Camden.

The freighter Turkana which appears in the movie was sunk soon after filming by a German raider.

Release
Distribution was done through MGM, the first time that company had handled an Australian feature film.

The Chief Films Censor, Cresswell O'Reilly, ruled that the film was not suitable for general exhibition (i.e. for adults and not children) but this was overturned on appeal.

The movie received generally positive reviews. However Monkman directed no further feature films.

The movie was re-released in 1952 as The Invaders.

References

External links

The Power and the Glory at National Film and Sound Archive
The Power and the Glory at Oz Movies

1941 films
Australian drama films
Australian black-and-white films
1941 drama films
1940s English-language films
1940s Australian films